The Rochester Museum & Science Center (RMSC) is a museum in Rochester, New York, dedicated to community education in science, technology and local history.  The museum also operates the Strasenburgh Planetarium, located next to the museum, and the Cumming Nature Center, a  nature preserve near Naples, New York.  The museum resides at 657 East Ave. and has a collection of 1.2 million artifacts.

Museum exhibits 
RMSC permanent exhibits offer visitors unique, interactive educational experiences. For example, the Science on a Sphere exhibit is an interactive globe and three-dimensional data projection system that changes real-time data from Earth and other planets into graphic representations. Permanent Simulator Rides include a submarine dive to the bottom of Lake Ontario and a hurricane simulator. The Inventor Center allows visitors participate in different main problem-solving challenges that are presented every four to five months, while Electricity Theater is a science show that features a display of indoor bolts of musical lightning produced by twin solid-state Tesla coils. Illumination: The World of Light and Optics is a permanent exhibit that features interactive opportunities to learn about reflection, refraction, radio waves, color temperature, etc.

The museum also teaches about local history in the exhibits such as The American Civil War: The Impact of the Industrial Revolution, Flight to Freedom: Rochester’s Underground Railroad and At the Western Door.

Outside of the museum, the Regional Green infrastructure Showcase teaches about the benefits of capturing and controlling stormwater runoff and green infrastructure in general.

Visitors can also look forward to new, exciting experiences each year through the traveling and temporary exhibits at the RMSC. In the past, these have included Frogs: A Chorus of Colors, Da Vinci—The Genius, DINOSAURS, Math Midway and Alien Worlds and Androids.

History 
The museum was established in 1912 as the Rochester Municipal Museum. Its first curator, Edward D. Putnam, served from 1913 until 1924, when New York archaeologist Arthur C. Parker took over as museum director. Parker began to expand the museum's holdings and research in anthropology, geology, biology, natural history, and the history and industry of the Genesee Region. He created the WPA-funded Indian Arts Project and is responsible for the construction of Bausch Hall.

In 1930, the name of the museum was changed to the Rochester Museum of Arts and Sciences.

W. Stephen Thomas, a trained museum professional from Philadelphia's Academy of Natural Sciences, succeeded Parker as museum director in 1945. Under his leadership, the museum saw the creation of state-of-the-art dioramas and growth of collections in history, technology, natural science, archaeology, and anthropology. Among the exhibits Thomas oversaw was a "pipe organ panorama" in the spring of 1955 that was visited by over 10,000 people.

Ian C. McLennan, former director of the Queen Elizabeth Planetarium in Edmonton, Alberta, Canada, was appointed as director of the creation of a planetarium in 1965 and followed Thomas as RMSC Executive Director from 1968 to 1972. 1968 saw the name of the museum change to its current title, the Rochester Museum & Science Center.

Richard C. Shultz took over as director from 1973 to 1996, and he oversaw the construction of the 400-set Eisenhart Auditorium and the Gannett School classroom building. He also established the Cumming Nature Center. Three capital campaigns provided the funding for the Elaine Wilson Hall in the museum, the giant-screen film system in the Strasenburgh Planetarium, improvements in collection storage and laboratories, and an increase in the endowment fund.

RMSC President Kate Bennett took the helm in 1996. Under her presidency, partnership projects with Monroe Boces 1 brought the Challenger Learning Center at the Strasenburgh Planetarium and the Bathysphere Underwater Biological Laboratory in the museum. The Genesee Community Charter School opened on the RMSC campus in 2001. The museum continues to create new galleries and new learning experiences for visitors. Bennet retired in 2018. 

In late 2018, Hillary Olson, a native of the Rochester area, became the 7th President and CEO of the RMSC. Olson has a rich museum and planetarium background and has worked at the Franklin Institute Science Museum, the Milwaukee Public Museum and the Griffith Observatory and Planetarium.

Strasenburgh Planetarium 
The Strasenburgh Planetarium, owned by RMSC, is located next to the museum. Open since 1968, the planetarium features star shows, giant-screen films and laser light shows under a four-story dome.

Cumming Nature Center 
The Cumming Nature Center, also owned by RMSC, is a 900-acre nature preserve near Naples, New York, dedicated to environmental education. It has over six miles of trails and offers educational programs and service opportunities.

References 

 "Home - Rochester Museum & Science Center." www.rmsc.org
 "Center, Rochester Museum & Science." RMSC LibCat - About the Collections." collections.rmsc.org
 "History of the Rochester Museum & Science Center - Rochester Museum & Science Center." www.rmsc.org

External links

 
1912 establishments in New York (state)
Museums established in 1912
Museums in Rochester, New York
Science museums in New York (state)